Hella Hammid (15 July 1921 – 1 May 1992) was an American photographer whose career included teaching at UCLA. Her freelance photographs appeared in diverse publications including Life, Ebony, The Sun and The New York Times. Her softly backlit picture of two young Italian girls dancing, watched by other children in front of the abutments of a stone building, was chosen by Edward Steichen for his 1955 world-touring MoMA exhibition The Family of Man, which was seen by nine million visitors.

Hammid had a long professional career taking "candid portraits" of children and families for private clients as well as contributing to a number of book projects. Hammid's photographic career is the subject of the book, Hella Hammid: Feminine Fate. One of her most widely circulated images is the Tree Poster, which portrays writer Deena Metzger, a close friend of Hammid's. 

Hammid was also a remote viewer who worked with Russell Targ and Harold E. Puthoff at SRI International doing work for the CIA.

She also worked with Stephan A. Schwartz on The Alexandria Project, considered to be psychic archaeology.

Hammid participated in the first Gateway Voyage program offered by Robert Monroe, founder of The Monroe Institute, that was held at the Esalen Institute at Big Sur in 1973.

Early life and education 
Hammid was born Hella Hilde Heyman on 15 July 1921 in Frankfurt, Germany. She immigrated to the United States on 14 September 1937, and later moved from New York City to Los Angeles. In 1939 she filed a declaration of intention to apply for US citizenship with the Southern District Of California. In fall 1940, she attended Black Mountain College for one semester as student, according to Buncombe County, North Carolina immigration records. Hammid also studied sociology at the City College of NY. 

Heyman married director and cinematographer Alexander Hammid (Alexandr Hackenschmied) in 1949 after his divorce in 1948 from Maya Deren (Eleanora Derenkowsky). The three worked together on Deren's films At Land (1944), Ritual in Transfigured Time (1946) and Invocation: Maya Deren (1987). In her early work as a cinematographer and actress, Heyman is sometimes also credited as Hella Hamon.

After their marriage, Hella and Alexander Hammid moved to the Upper West Side of Manhattan and had two children, Julia (1950) and gem photographer Tino (1952–2015).

References

External links 
Black Mountain College Museum Arts Center - Question Everything exhibit 2021
Art in Box Gallery - Prague exhibit 2015-2016
Hella Hammid: Feminine Fate - 2015 book 

1921 births
1992 deaths
20th-century American women artists
American women photographers
Black Mountain College alumni
German emigrants to the United States
Photographers from California
Photographers from New York City
Remote viewers
SRI International people
University of California, Los Angeles faculty